Anton Sergeyevich Sidelnikov (born 17 April 1981) is a former Russian professional footballer.

Club career
He played in the Russian Football National League for FC Amur Blagoveshchensk in 2005.

References

External links
 

1981 births
Living people
Russian footballers
Association football forwards
FC Zhetysu players
Kazakhstan Premier League players
Russian expatriate footballers
Expatriate footballers in Kazakhstan
Russian expatriate sportspeople in Kazakhstan
FC Chita players
FC Amur Blagoveshchensk players